Idalus noiva is a moth of the family Erebidae. It was described by E. Dukinfield Jones in 1914. It is found in Brazil.

References

 

noiva
Moths described in 1914